Lori White is an American academic and administrator. White currently serves as the President of DePauw University, a liberal arts college and School of Music in Greencastle, Indiana. She was previously the vice chancellor of student affairs at Washington University in St. Louis. She is the first woman and first person of color to serve as president of the DePauw University, and the only person of color to serve as president of an Indiana university.

Early life and education

White has a bachelor's degree in English and psychology from University of California, Berkeley and her doctorate in education administration and policy analysis from Stanford University.

Career
White has held administrative and academic positions at Southern Methodist University, Stanford University, University of Southern California and San Diego University. In 2015, she became vice chancellor of student affairs Washington University in St. Louis. In July 2020, she became the president of DePauw University.

Personal life

White's father was Joseph White and her sister is paleontologist Lisa White.

References

External links
 Biography at DePauw University

American academic administrators
Academics from California
Presidents of DePauw University
African-American women academics
American women academics
African-American academics
Washington University in St. Louis faculty
UC Berkeley College of Letters and Science alumni
Stanford Graduate School of Education alumni
Southern Methodist University people
University of Southern California people
Year of birth missing (living people)
Living people
Women heads of universities and colleges